S. S. Ramasubbu (born 11 February 1950 in Alangulam, Tirunelveli) is an Indian politician who served as a Member of Parliament for Tirunelvelifrom 2009 to 2014
 and as Member of the Legislative Assembly. He was elected to the Tamil Nadu legislative assembly as an Indian National Congress candidate from Alangulam constituency in the 1989 and 1991 elections.

Ramasubbu's father S.Sudalaimuthu Nadar was active for the Indian National Congress party in Nellai District. Ramasubbu's political career started as the District Student Congress Secretary in 1972. After seven years working in a bank he became a full-time politician for the Congress party.

In 1989 the Congress party committee for Tamil Nadu decided to contest the Assembly election independently without an alliance with a Dravidian party. Ramasubbu was selected to contest the Alangulam Constituency, which he won against Aladi Aruna and Karuppasamy Pandian. Ramasubbu stood again in the Assembly Election of 1991 and was voted in with a larger majority of 32,000 votes.

In the 2009 General Election he was elected to the Lok Shabha by the Tirunelveli constituency voters. During that session of parliament he asked more than 1,000 questions and introduced the Fishermen (Welfare) Bill and the Special Educational Facilities Bill (For Children of Parents Living Below Poverty Line).

Electoral performance

References

External links 
 

India MPs 2009–2014
Indian National Congress politicians from Tamil Nadu
Living people
United Progressive Alliance candidates in the 2014 Indian general election
Lok Sabha members from Tamil Nadu
1950 births
People from Tirunelveli district
Tamil Nadu MLAs 1991–1996